Kingston Springs is a town in Cheatham County, Tennessee, United States. The population was 2,824 at the 2020 census and 2,756 at the 2010 census.

Geography

Climate

Demographics

2020 census

As of the 2020 United States census, there were 2,824 people, 1,013 households, and 772 families residing in the town.

2000 census
In the 2000 United States Census, there were 2,773 people, 983 households, and 809 families in the town. The population density was 283.7 people per square mile (109.6/km2). There were 1,015 housing units, at an average density of 103.9 per square mile (40.1/km2).  The racial composition of the town was 97.44% White, 0.87% African American, 0.36% Native American, 0.54% Asian, 0.40% from other races, and 0.40% from two or more races. Hispanic or Latino of any race were 0.54%

Of the 983 households, 43.0% had children under the age of 18 living with them, 69.1% were married couples living together, 8.9% had a female householder with no husband present, and 17.7% were non-families. 13.0% of households were one person and 3.2% were one person aged 65 or older. The average household size was 2.82 and the average family size was 3.10.

The age distribution was 28.5% under the age of 18, 6.9% from 18 to 24, 33.1% from 25 to 44, 25.5% from 45 to 64, and 6.0% 65 or older. The median age was 37 years. For every 100 females, there were 98.8 males. For every 100 females who were 18 and over, there were 94.5 males.

The median household income was $58,490, and the median family income was $60,125. Males had a median income of $41,543 and females had $30,650. The per capita income for the town was $24,519, and about 5.9% of families and 8.4% of the population were below the poverty line, including 12.0% of those under age 18 and 7.4% of those age 65 or over.

Government

Kingston Springs is governed by a city commission. The board of commissioners are elected and the commissioners pick amongst themselves for the seats of Mayor and Vice Mayor. Currently the non-mayoral city commissioners are Carolyn Clark, Mike Hargis, and Bob Stohler. Tony Gross serves as the mayor, and Glenn Remick is the vice-mayor.

References

External links
 KingstonSprings.net - Town Website.
 SCPL - South Cheatham Public Library.

Towns in Cheatham County, Tennessee
Towns in Tennessee